Daisy Jones & The Six is an American musical drama streaming television miniseries developed by Scott Neustadter and Michael H. Weber, based on the 2019 novel of the same name by Taylor Jenkins Reid. Set in the Los Angeles music scene of the late 1970s, the series charts the rise and fall of the fictional titular rock band. 

Daisy Jones & The Six premiered on Amazon Prime Video on March 3, 2023. It contains ten episodes, each released weekly.

Premise
Daisy Jones & The Six follows "a rock band in the 1970s from their rise in the LA music scene to becoming one of the most famous bands in the world and explores the reason behind their split at the height of their success." The Amazon Prime Video series is based on Taylor Jenkins Reid's book of the same name, which the author describes was partly inspired by her experience growing up and by watching Fleetwood Mac performances on television.

Cast and characters

Main
 Riley Keough as Daisy Jones, the lead singer and songwriter
 Sam Claflin as Billy Dunne, the lead singer and songwriter
 Camila Morrone as Camila Alvarez, Billy's wife and the band's photographer
 Suki Waterhouse as Karen Sirko, the keyboardist
 Will Harrison as Graham Dunne, the lead guitarist
 Josh Whitehouse as Eddie Roundtree, the bassist
 Sebastian Chacon as Warren Rojas, the drummer
 Nabiyah Be as Simone Jackson, Daisy's former roommate and future disco singer
 Tom Wright as Teddy Price, the producer
 Timothy Olyphant as Rod Reyes, tour manager

Recurring
 Seychelle Gabriel as interviewer
 Jacqueline Obradors as Lucia, Camila's mother
 Ross Partridge as Don Midleton, a record producer
 Ayesha Harris as Bernie, a disc jockey and Simone's lover
 Gavin Drea as Nicky, Daisy's husband

Guest
 Jack Romano as Chuck Loving, the original bassist for The Dunne Brothers
 Nicole LaLiberte as Jean
 Chris Diamantopoulos as Lee Parlin
 Olivia Rose Keegan as Caroline
 Nick Pupo as Jonah Berg, a reporter for Rolling Stone magazine

Episodes

Production

Development
The series was announced on July 25, 2019. The series is written by Scott Neustadter and Michael H. Weber, who serve as executive producers alongside Reese Witherspoon and Lauren Neustadter. Taylor Jenkins Reid also produces the series. Production companies involved in the series are Hello Sunshine, Circle of Confusion and Amazon Studios.

Casting
In mid November 2019, it was announced that Riley Keough and Camila Morrone had joined the cast of the series. In February 2020, Sam Claflin, Suki Waterhouse, Nabiyah Be, Will Harrison, Josh Whitehouse, and Sebastian Chacon joined the cast of the series. In October 2021, Tom Wright and Jacqueline Obradors were cast in starring and recurring capacity, respectively. The following November, Timothy Olyphant joined the series in a recurring role.

Filming
The series began filming in late September 2021 and wrapped in early May 2022 in New Orleans.

Music
The single "Regret Me" from the fictional band in the series, Daisy Jones & the Six, was released on January 25, 2023. The second single "Look at Us Now (Honeycomb)" was released on February 15, 2023. A full-length album, Aurora, was released by Atlantic Records on March 2, 2023. The album's lead vocals were performed by Riley Keough and Sam Claflin. It was composed, performed, and produced by Blake Mills, with additional production by Tony Berg and in collaboration with musicians such as Chris Weisman, Jackson Browne, Marcus Mumford, and Phoebe Bridgers.

Release
The limited series was released on Amazon Prime Video on March 3, 2023, with the first three episodes available immediately. The first episode was shown in US theaters for one night only to Amazon Prime members on March 1, 2023.

Reception
The review aggregator website Rotten Tomatoes reported a 73% approval rating with an average rating of 6.8/10, based on 86 critic reviews. The website's critics consensus reads, "Daisy Jones & the Six comes up short at evoking the rockstar credentials that were implied on the page, but the lively duet of Riley Keough and Sam Claflin give this adaptation enough verve to occasionally bring the house down." Metacritic, which uses a weighted average, assigned a score of 62 out of 100 based on 36 critics, indicating "generally favorable reviews".

References

External links
 

2020s American drama television miniseries
2023 American television series debuts
Amazon Prime Video original programming
American musical television series
English-language television shows
Nonlinear narrative television series
Television series about fictional musicians
Television series based on American novels
Television series by Amazon Studios
Television series set in the 1960s
Television series set in the 1970s
Television series set in 1997
Television shows based on American novels
Television shows filmed in New Orleans
Television shows set in Los Angeles